Coker was a community located in north central Bexar County, Texas (USA) near Hill Country Village, along Loop 1604 .

History

James Harrison Coker (1827–1892),  son of Joseph Coker, John Coker's brother, was the first teacher at the Coker School, and his daughter Sarah Jane Coker (1860–1930) was the midwife there. Sarah Jane was married to Zachary Taylor Autry who was a Texas Ranger and early settler of Northern Bexar County, Texas.

A family member can be found under the name of Andie Coker, currently residing in Round Rock, Texas.

See also
John Coker
Republic of Texas

External links
 Arthur Everett Rector
Young Perry Alsbury
John Coker
Coker Cemetery
Founding of Coker Texas

Sources

 Haunting the graveyard, Coker Cemetery Association; 1st edition (September 3, 2019) 

Neighborhoods in Texas
Geography of Bexar County, Texas
Populated places established in 1841
Ghost towns in Central Texas
1841 establishments in the Republic of Texas